Mieczysław Marcin Łuczak (born 9 July 1955 in Wieluń) is a Polish politician. He was elected to Sejm on 25 September 2005, getting 6,105 votes in 11 Sieradz district as a candidate from the Polish People's Party list.

See also
Members of Polish Sejm 2005-2007

External links
Mieczysław Marcin Łuczak - parliamentary page - includes declarations of interest, voting record, and transcripts of speeches.

Members of the Polish Sejm 2005–2007
Polish People's Party politicians
1955 births
Living people